Blues, Studio One was an Australian television series which aired live on Melbourne station HSV-7 for five episodes in 1957. The first episode aired Tuesday, 24 September 1957 at 7:15PM, while the remaining episodes were aired on Wednesdays at 7:00PM. The series starred singer Joan Bilceaux and her Quintet.

References

External links

Seven Network original programming
1957 Australian television series debuts
1957 Australian television series endings
Australian music television series
Black-and-white Australian television shows
English-language television shows